Sunrise Ford Racing (SFR), sometimes referred to as Bob Bruncati Racing, was an American professional stock car racing team that last competed full-time in the ARCA Menards Series West. It was a subsidiary of the Sunrise Ford dealership network based in North Hollywood and Fontana, California. The team last fielded the No. 6 Ford Fusion for Jake Drew and the No. 9 Ford for Tanner Reif in 2022.

History
The team was formed by Bob Bruncati in 2000 to allow his sons to race at the Irwindale Event Center. On November 4, 2022, it was announced that SFR would shut down operations following the 2022 ARCA West season, to focus on local short track racing.

ARCA Menards Series West
SFR moved to the West Series in 2006 as a way to stay involved in racing and to promote Sunrise Ford dealerships on a wider scale. Over the course of their time in the series, the team has won four series championships. Jason Bowles won the title in 2009, Derek Thorn in 2013 and 2018, and Jake Drew in 2022. All four of Sunrise Ford's titles came with their No. 6 car. In 2020, the team formed a driver development program with Stewart-Haas Racing.

Car No. 6 history

Originally operating as car No. 22, Jason Bowles drove the car for SFR's first three full-time seasons, winning Rookie of the Year in 2007 and the series championship in 2009. Luis Martinez Jr. drove the entry in 2010, earning Rookie of the Year honors. He returned to the seat in 2011.

Derek Thorn drove Sunrise's main No. 6 in 2012 and 2013, winning the drivers' championship in his second year. James Bickford replaced Thorn for the following season, and won races at Stateline Speedway in both 2014 and 2015. Cole Rouse then drove the No. 6 in 2016. He was then replaced by Julia Landauer for 2017.

Thorn returned to Sunrise's No. 6 in 2018, and won Sunrise's third championship. Jagger Jones drove the No. 6 for 2019, winning one race and earning Rookie of the Year honors. Trevor Huddleston took over the No. 6 entry in 2020 and he returned in 2021. In 2022, Jake Drew took over the ride and won the championship.

Car No. 9 history

In his lone West Series season, Austin Dyne won Rookie of the Year driving the No. 9 car in 2012. The No. 9 was driven by Dylan Lupton for 2013 and 2014. He got two wins, the first at Evergreen Speedway in 2013, and Kern County in 2014. Lupton also claimed West Series Rookie of the Year in 2013. For the next two years, Ryan Partridge drove the No. 9, notching four wins. For 2017, the No. 9 was a full-time team; Zane Smith drove the opening race, and after an offer from team owner Bob Bruncati, Michael Self drove the car in the rest of the events. Partridge, returning to the seat, finished second in the 2018 point standings behind teammate Derek Thorn. He then was replaced by Trevor Huddleston who drove the No. 9 for 2019. Clinton Cram served as crew chief in 2019. Blaine Perkins drove the car in 2020. Jake Drew then joined the team in 2021, losing to Jesse Love in a tiebreaker. Tanner Reif took over the car in 2022, making Drew switch to the 6.

Car No. 22 history

2016 was the first year the team's third entry raced. Trevor Huddleston and James Bruncati each ran one race in the car. In 2017, the car was also used as an occasional entry, this time for Thorn. For 2018, Huddleston returned to the No. 22 for a full season.

References

External links
  (Sunrise Ford dealerships)

NASCAR teams
2000 establishments in California
2022 disestablishments in California